Magda Dávid (born 23 February 1942) is a Hungarian former swimmer. She competed in two events at the 1960 Summer Olympics.

References

External links
 

1942 births
Living people
Hungarian female backstroke swimmers
Olympic swimmers of Hungary
Swimmers at the 1960 Summer Olympics
Swimmers from Budapest
Medalists at the 1961 Summer Universiade
Universiade medalists in swimming
Universiade silver medalists for Hungary
20th-century Hungarian women
21st-century Hungarian women